Killimor is a village in east County Galway, Ireland. It is situated on the N65 national secondary road and contains a number of facilities including a Heritage Centre, Roman Catholic church, a post office, a national school, public library, health centre, supermarket, pharmacy, restaurants, take-away and a number of public houses.

See also
 List of towns and villages in Ireland

References

External links 
 Killimor website

Towns and villages in County Galway